Rathbennett is a townland in County Westmeath, Ireland.

Rathbennett is one of 15 townlands of the civil parish of Leny in the barony of Corkaree in the Province of Leinster. The neighbouring townlands are: Leny and Rathaniska to the north, Kilpatrick to the east, Mountmurray and Piercefield to the south and Farrow to the west.

In the 1911 census of Ireland there were 11 houses and 44 inhabitants in the townland.

References

External links
The IreAtlas Townland Data Base
Rathbennett at Townlands.ie
Rathbennett at Logainm.ie

Townlands of County Westmeath